Prahúa is one of eleven parishes (administrative divisions)  in Candamo, a municipality within the province and autonomous community of Asturias, in northern Spain.

Villages
 La Mortera 
 Prahúa

References 

Parishes in Candamo